The 70th New York State Legislature, consisting of the New York State Senate and the New York State Assembly, met from January 5 to December 15, 1847, during the first year of John Young's governorship, in Albany.

Background
Under the provisions of the New York Constitution of 1821, 32 Senators were elected on general tickets in eight senatorial districts for four-year terms. They were divided into four classes, and every year eight Senate seats came up for election. Assemblymen were elected countywide on general tickets to a one-year term, the whole Assembly being renewed annually.

On May 13, 1845, an "Act recommending a Convention of the people of this State" was passed, submitting at the next State election to the people the question whether they wanted to call a convention to amend the State Constitution. At the State election in November 1845, the question was answered in the affirmative. The Constitutional convention met from June 1 to October 9, 1846. The amended Constitution abolished rotative renewal of the Senate, required all legislators to be elected in single districts, made the State cabinet offices elective by popular ballot, and made major changes in the judicial system. The new Constitution was submitted to the electorate at the next State election for ratification.

On March 30, 1846, the Legislature re-apportioned the Assembly districts: Chautauqua, Chenango, Columbia, Cortland, Madison, Ontario and Wyoming counties lost one seat each; Albany, Erie, Kings and St. Lawrence counties gained one seat each; and New York City gained three seats. The total number of assemblymen remained 128.

On May 13, 1846, the Legislature re-apportioned the Senate districts: Kings County was transferred from the 1st to the 2nd District; Ulster County from the 2nd to the 3rd District; and Schenectady County from the 3rd to the 4th District.

At this time there were two major political parties: the Democratic Party and the Whig Party. The Democratic Party was split into two factions: the "Barnburners" and the "Hunkers." The radical abolitionists appeared as the Liberty Party. The Anti-Rent Party nominated some candidates, but mostly cross-endorsed Whigs or Democrats, according to their opinion on the rent issue.

The Whig state convention met on September 23 at Utica, and nominated Assemblyman John Young for Governor; and Hamilton Fish for Lieutenant Governor.

The Democratic state convention met on October 1 at Syracuse, and nominated Gov. Silas Wright and Lt. Gov. Addison Gardner for re-election.

The Anti-Rent state convention met in October at Beardsley's Hotel in Albany, and endorsed John Young (W) for Governor; and Lt. Gov. Addison Gardiner (D) for re-election.

The Native American state convention nominated Ogden Edwards for Governor; and State Senator George Folsom for Lieutenant Governor.

The Liberty state convention nominated Henry Bradley for Governor and William L. Chaplin for Lieutenant Governor.

Elections
The New York state election, 1846 was held on November 3. John Young (W) was elected Governor; and Lt. Gov. Addison Gardiner (D) was re-elected. The new Constitution was adopted by a large majority, with 221,528 votes for and 92, 436 against it.

Harvey R. Morris (2nd D.), Thomas Crook (4th D.), Samuel H. P. Hall (6th D.), Abraham Gridley (7th D.), Francis H. Ruggles (8th D.); and assemblymen John Townsend (1st D.), Ira Harris (3rd D.) and Nelson J. Beach (5th D.) were elected to the State Senate.

Sessions
The Legislature met for the regular session at the Old State Capitol in Albany on January 5, 1847; and adjourned on May 13.

William C. Hasbrouck (W) was elected Speaker with 71 votes against 50 for J. Lawrence Smith (D).

On February 12, Albert Lester (D) was elected president pro tempore of the State Senate, to preside during the absence of Lt. Gov. Gardiner.

On June 7, the New York special judicial election, 1847, was held to fill the judicial offices elective under the new State Constitution, for example the judges of the New York Court of Appeals, the justices of the district benches of the New York Supreme Court, county judges, surrogates, district attorneys etc. Lt. Gov. Gardiner was elected to the Court of Appeals. State Senators Ira Harris and Augustus C. Hand; and Assemblyman William B. Wright were elected to the Supreme Court.

On July 5, Lt. Gov. Gardiner took office on the Court of Appeals, and President pro tempore Albert Lester became Acting Lieutenant Governor.

The Legislature met for a special session on September 8, 1847; and adjourned on December 15.

On September 27, the Legislative passed "An Act to provide for the election of a Lieutenant Governor", to fill the vacancy at the next State election.

On November 15, the Legislature elected Thomas Clowes (W) as a Canal Commissioner, to fill the vacancy caused by the resignation of Nathaniel Jones (D).

State Senate

Districts
 The First District (4 seats) consisted of New York and Richmond counties.
 The Second District (4 seats) consisted of Dutchess, Kings, Orange, Putnam, Queens, Rockland, Suffolk, Sullivan and Westchester counties.
 The Third District (4 seats) consisted of Albany, Columbia, Delaware, Greene, Rensselaer, Schoharie and Ulster counties.
 The Fourth District (4 seats) consisted of Clinton, Essex, Franklin, Fulton, Hamilton, Herkimer, Montgomery, St. Lawrence, Saratoga, Schenectady, Warren and Washington counties.
 The Fifth District (4 seats) consisted of Jefferson, Lewis, Madison, Oneida, Oswego and Otsego counties.
 The Sixth District (4 seats) consisted of Allegany, Broome, Cattaraugus, Chemung, Chenango, Livingston, Steuben, Tioga and Tompkins counties.
 The Seventh District (4 seats) consisted of Cayuga, Cortland, Onondaga, Ontario, Seneca, Wayne and Yates counties.
 The Eighth District (4 seats) consisted of Chautauqua, Erie, Genesee, Monroe, Niagara, Orleans and Wyoming counties.

Note: There are now 62 counties in the State of New York. The counties which are not mentioned in this list had not yet been established, or sufficiently organized, the area being included in one or more of the abovementioned counties.

Members
The asterisk (*) denotes members of the previous Legislature who continued in office as members of this Legislature. John Townsend, Ira Harris and Nelson J. Beach changed from the Assembly to the Senate.

Under the provisions of the new State Constitution, all senators were legislated out of office at the end of the year 1847, and all 32 seats were to be filled at the election in November 1847 with senators elected to a two-year term in single districts.

Employees
 Clerk: Isaac R. Elwood
 Deputy Clerk: John P. Lott
 Sergeant-at-Arms: Charles Bryan
 Doorkeeper: Jared S. Halsey
 Assistant Doorkeeper: Martin Miller
 Janitor: Burgess Wands
 Messengers: John H. Finnegan, Joseph Courtney Jr.

State Assembly

Districts

 Albany County (4 seats)
 Allegany County (2 seats)
 Broome County (1 seat)
 Cattaraugus County (2 seats)
 Cayuga County (3 seats)
 Chautauqua County (2 seats)
 Chemung County (1 seat)
 Chenango County (2 seats)
 Clinton County (1 seat)
 Columbia County (2 seats)
 Cortland County (1 seat)
 Delaware County (2 seats)
 Dutchess County (3 seats)
 Erie County (4 seats)
 Essex County (1 seat)
 Franklin County (1 seat)
 Fulton and Hamilton counties (1 seat)
 Genesee County (2 seats)
 Greene County (2 seats)
 Herkimer County (2 seats)
 Jefferson County (3 seats)
 Kings County (3 seats)
 Lewis County (1 seat)
 Livingston County (2 seats)
 Madison County (2 seats)
 Monroe County (3 seats)
 Montgomery County (2 seats)
 The City and County of New York (16 seats)
 Niagara County (2 seats)
 Oneida County (4 seats)
 Onondaga County (4 seats)
 Ontario County (2 seats)
 Orange County (3 seats)
 Orleans County (1 seat)
 Oswego County (2 seats)
 Otsego County (3 seats)
 Putnam County (1 seat)
 Queens County (1 seat)
 Rensselaer County (3 seats)
 Richmond County (1 seat)
 Rockland County (1 seat)
 St. Lawrence County (3 seats)
 Saratoga County (2 seats)
 Schenectady County (1 seat)
 Schoharie County (2 seats)
 Seneca County (1 seat)
 Steuben County (3 seats)
 Suffolk County (2 seats)
 Sullivan County (1 seat)
 Tioga County (1 seat)
 Tompkins County (2 seats)
 Ulster County (2 seats)
 Warren County (1 seat)
 Washington (2 seats)
 Wayne County (2 seats)
 Westchester County (2 seats)
 Wyoming County (1 seat)
 Yates County (1 seat)

Note: There are now 62 counties in the State of New York. The counties which are not mentioned in this list had not yet been established, or sufficiently organized, the area being included in one or more of the abovementioned counties.

Assemblymen
The asterisk (*) denotes members of the previous Legislature who continued as members of this Legislature.

Party affiliations follow the vote on Clerk, except Keyser and Walsh (both NYC).

Employees
 Clerk: Philander B. Prindle
 Sergeant-at-Arms: Daniel B. Davis
 Doorkeeper: Asa W. Carpenter
 Assistant Doorkeeper: DeWitt C. Crooker
 Second Assistant Doorkeeper: Robert Grant

Notes

Sources
 The New York Civil List compiled by Franklin Benjamin Hough (Weed, Parsons and Co., 1858) [pg. 109 and 441 for Senate districts; pg. 135f for senators; pg. 148f for Assembly districts; pg. 232ff for assemblymen]

070
1847 in New York (state)
1847 U.S. legislative sessions